Marović (Cyrillic script: Маровић) is a South Slavic surname. It may refer to:

Ana Marija Marović (1815–1887), Italian nun
Bojan Marović (born 1984), Montenegrin singer and actor
Dražen Marović (born 1938), Croatian chess player, trainer, journalist, writer and broadcaster
Marko Marović (born 1983), Serbian footballer
Slobodan Marović (born 1964), former Montenegrin footballer
Svetozar Marović (born 1955), lawyer and a Montenegrin politician
Uroš Marović (1946–2014), Serbian water polo player

Croatian surnames
Serbian surnames